Polars is the debut studio album by Dutch metal band Textures. It was released on August 25, 2003, by Listenable Records. The album was recorded, produced, mixed and mastered by the band themselves. The label re-issued the album in 2004 with slightly different cover art (adding images of machinery and gears) and in some cases, a different casing.

The album contains eight songs, the sixth and eighth of which are wholly ambient with assorted sound effects. It is their only album featuring vocalist Pieter Verpaalen, who was replaced by Eric Kalsbeek for their second release.

The CD also features the video for "Ostensibly Impregnable".

Track listing

Personnel
Textures
Jochem Jacobs - guitars, backing vocals
Stef Broks - drums
Dennis Aarts - bass guitar
Bart Hennephof - guitars, backing vocals
Pieter Verpaalen - lead vocals
Richard Rietdijk - synthesizer, keyboards

Production
Jochem Jacobs - recording, mixing, mastering
Richard Rietdijk - recording, mixing
Bart Hennephof - artwork, layout

References

2003 debut albums
Textures (band) albums
Listenable Records albums
Nuclear Blast albums